The largest small octagon is the octagon that has the largest area among all convex octagons with unit diameter.  The diameter of a polygon is the length of the longest segment joining two of its vertices.  The exact value of the area of the largest small octagon lies between 0.72686845 and 0.72686849, and is approximately 2.8% larger than the area of the regular octagon.  This octagon was found in 2002 using global optimization algorithms.  The optimal hexagon was found in 1975 by finding the roots of a degree 10 polynomial.

See also 
 Biggest little polygon

References

External links 
 2010 Toulouse Global Optimization Workshop
 Optimal hexagon at Wolfram MathWorld

Combinatorics
Types of polygons